Kadu, Kadú or KADU may refer to:

People 
Kadu (Brazilian footballer) (born 1986), Brazilian football player
Kadú (Angolan footballer) (born 1994), Angolan football player
Kadu Makrani (died 1878), Indian insurgent
Jorge Kadú (born 1991), Cape Verdean football player
Omprakash Babarao Kadu (born 1970), Indian politician

Places 
Kadu Kuttai, India
Kadu, Iran
Kadu Sara, Iran

Other uses 
Kadu (software)
Kadu language, of Myanmar
Kadu languages of Sudan
Kadu people of Burma
Kenya African Democratic Union (KADU), Kenyan political party
KADU, radio station in Minnesota, United States

See also 

 Kaadu (disambiguation)
 Kaddu
 Kaidu or Qaidu, (1230-1301),  great-grandson of Genghis Khan 

Language and nationality disambiguation pages